Conservative morphological anti-aliasing (CMAA) is an antialiasing technique originally developed by Filip Strugar at Intel. CMAA is an image-based, post processing technique similar to that of morphological antialiasing.

CMAA uses 4 main steps which are image analysis for color discontinuities, locally dominant edge detection, simple shape handling, and lastly symmetrical long edge shape handling.

A couple of years after CMAA was introduced, Intel unveiled an updated version which they named CMAA2.

See also
 Multisample anti-aliasing
 Fast approximate anti-aliasing
 Temporal anti-aliasing
 Supersampling
 Spatial anti-aliasing

References

Image processing
Computer graphic artifacts
Anti-aliasing algorithms